The Assault is a 2010 French action thriller film directed by Julien Leclercq, based on the 1994 hijacking of Air France Flight 8969 by Algerian Islamic fundamentalist terrorists and the raid to free the hostages by the GIGN, the elite counter-terrorism unit of the French National Gendarmerie.

Cast 

 Vincent Elbaz as Thierry Prungnaud
 Grégori Derangère as Commander Denis Favier
 Mélanie Bernier as Carole Jeanton
  as Yahia 
 Chems Dahmani as Mustapha
 Djanis Bouzyani as Salim
 Marie Guillard as Claire Prungnaud
 Naturel Le Ruyet as Emma
 Philippe Bas as Didier
 Antoine Basler as Solignac
  as Roland Môntins
 Mohid Abid as Makhlouf
 Fatima Adoum as Djida
 Hugo Becker as Vincent Leroy
 Abdelhafid Metalsi as Ali Touchent
 Claire Chazal as News presenter

Reception
, review aggregation website Rotten Tomatoes reported an approval rating of 53%, based on 145 reviews, with an average score of 5.86/10. At Metacritic, which assigns a normalized rating out of 100 to reviews from mainstream critics, the film received an average score of 55, based on 7 reviews, indicating "mixed or average reviews".

References

External links
 

2010 films
2010 action thriller films
2010s French-language films
Action films based on actual events
Air France–KLM
Films about aircraft hijackings
Films about jihadism
Films about terrorism in Africa
Films directed by Julien Leclercq
Films set in 1994
Films set in Algiers
French films based on actual events
French action thriller films
GIGN
Thriller films based on actual events
2010s French films